Seal point, Seal Point or Seal-point may refer to:

Point (coat color), a coat coloration in some breeds of cats
Seal Point (Graham Land), a headland on the Antarctic Peninsula
Seal Point (Victoria Land), a headland in the Ross Dependency
Tyuleniy Point, Queen Maud Land, Antarctica (Tyuleniy is Russian for "seal")
Seal Point Lighthouse, in South Africa
Seal Point, a headland on Otago Peninsula, New Zealand
Seal Point Park, San Francisco, California
Sealed-point detector, a form of electrolytic detector
Seal Point, Victoria, a headland near Apollo Bay, Victoria, Australia